Ducat is an unincorporated community in Wood County, in the U.S. state of Ohio.

History
Ducat was platted in 1890, and named for Exea and Thomas J. Ducat, proprietors. A post office called Ducat was established in 1890, and remained in operation until 1909.

References

Unincorporated communities in Wood County, Ohio
Unincorporated communities in Ohio